Robert Hudson Walker (October 13, 1918 – August 28, 1951) was an American actor who starred as the villain in Alfred Hitchcock's thriller Strangers on a Train (1951), which was released shortly before his early demise.

He started in youthful boy-next-door roles, often as a World War II soldier. One of these roles was opposite his first wife, Jennifer Jones, in the World War II epic Since You Went Away (1944). He also played Jerome Kern in Till the Clouds Roll By. Twice divorced by 30, he suffered from alcoholism and mental illness, which were exacerbated by his painful separation and divorce from Jones.

Early life
Walker was born in Salt Lake City, Utah. Emotionally scarred by his parents' divorce when he was still a child, he subsequently developed an interest in acting, which led his maternal aunt, Hortense McQuarrie Odlum (then the president of Bonwit Teller), to offer to pay for his enrollment at the American Academy of Dramatic Arts in New York City in 1937. Walker lived in her home during his first year in the city.

Career and personal life
While attending the American Academy of Dramatic Arts, Walker met fellow aspiring actress Phylis Isley, who later took the stage name Jennifer Jones. After a brief courtship, the couple married in Tulsa, Oklahoma, on January 2, 1939. Walker had some small unbilled parts in films such as Winter Carnival (1939), and two Lana Turner films at MGM: These Glamour Girls (1939) and Dancing Co-Ed (1939). 

Walker's and Jennifer Jones' elder son Robert Walker Jr. (1940-2019) later became a successful movie actor, working with John Wayne, Robert Mitchum, Kirk Douglas and Walter Matthau among many others. Their other son, Michael Walker (1941-2007), was also an actor who appeared in films The Rogues (1964), Coronet Blue (1967) and Hell's Belles (1969) and several '60s TV series including Perry Mason: The Case of the Cheating Chancellor (1965).

Radio
Walker found work in radio while Isley stayed home and gave birth to two sons in quick succession - Robert Walker Jr. (1940–2019) and Michael Walker (1941–2007).

Walker co-starred in the weekly radio show Maudie's Diary from August 1941 to September 1942. Isley then returned to auditioning where her luck changed when she was discovered in 1941 by producer David O. Selznick, who changed her name to Jennifer Jones and groomed her for stardom.

MGM
The couple returned to Hollywood, and Selznick's connections helped Walker secure a contract with Metro-Goldwyn-Mayer, where he started work on the war drama Bataan (1943), playing a soldier who fights in the Bataan retreat.

He followed it with a supporting role in Madame Curie (1943). Both were notable commercial successes.

Stardom

Walker's charming demeanor and boyish good looks caught on with audiences, and he was promoted to stardom with the title part of the romantic soldier in See Here, Private Hargrove (1944).

He also appeared in Selznick's Since You Went Away (1944), in which he and his wife portrayed doomed young lovers during World War II. By that time, Jones' affair with Selznick was common knowledge, and Jones and Walker separated in November 1943, in mid-production. The filming of their love scenes was torturous as Selznick insisted that Walker perform take after take of each love scene with Jones. She filed for divorce in April 1945. Since You Went Away was one of the most financially successful movies of 1944, earning over $7 million.

Back at MGM, Walker appeared alongside Spencer Tracy and Van Johnson in Thirty Seconds Over Tokyo (1944), the story of the Doolittle Raid. He played flight engineer and turret gunner David Thatcher, and it was another box office hit.

Walker starred as a GI preparing for overseas deployment in The Clock (1945), with Judy Garland playing his love interest in her second non-musical film. (Garland’s first non-musical was Life Begins for Andy Hardy (1941).  Although she recorded four songs for the picture, all were dropped before it was released.)  Directed by her soon-to-be husband Vincente Minnelli, The Clock was profitable, though not as successful as Garland's musicals.

He then made a romantic comedy with Hedy Lamarr and June Allyson, Her Highness and the Bellboy (1945). Then he did a second Hargrove film, What Next, Corporal Hargrove? (1945) and a romantic comedy with June Allyson, The Sailor Takes a Wife (1945).

Walker starred in the musical Till the Clouds Roll By (1946), in which he played the popular composer Jerome Kern.  This movie had rental receipts of over $6 million. He starred as another composer, Johannes Brahms, in Song of Love (1947), which co-starred Katharine Hepburn and Paul Henreid, which lost MGM over $1 million. In between, he made a film about the construction of the atomic bomb, The Beginning or the End (1946), which also resulted in a loss at the box office, and a Tracy-Hepburn drama directed by Elia Kazan, The Sea of Grass (1947), which was profitable.

In 1948, Walker was borrowed by Universal to star with Ava Gardner in the film One Touch of Venus, directed by William A. Seiter. The film was a non-musical comedy adapted from a Broadway show with music by Kurt Weill. Walker married Barbara Ford, the daughter of director John Ford, in July 1948, but the marriage lasted only five months.

Back at MGM Walker was in two films that lost money, Please Believe Me (1950) with Deborah Kerr and The Skipper Surprised His Wife (1950) with Joan Leslie. More popular was a Western with Burt Lancaster, Vengeance Valley (1951), a notable hit.

Final years
In 1949, Walker spent time at the Menninger Clinic, where he was treated for a psychiatric disorder. Following his discharge, he was cast by director Alfred Hitchcock in Strangers on a Train (1951), for which he received acclaim for his performance as the charming psychopath Bruno Anthony. 

In his final film, Walker played the title role of Leo McCarey's My Son John (1952), made at the height of the Red Scare. Despite the film's anti-Communist themes, Walker was allegedly neither liberal nor conservative, despite being a Republican, and took the job to work with McCarey and co-star Helen Hayes. Walker died before production finished, and so angles from his death scene in Strangers were spliced into a similar melodramatic death scene near the end of the film.

Walker was a registered Republican who supported Dwight Eisenhower's campaign in the 1952 presidential election, and was of the Mormon faith.

Death
On the night of August 28, 1951, Walker's housekeeper reportedly found Walker in an emotional state. She called the actor's psychiatrist, Frederick Hacker, who arrived and administered amobarbital for sedation. Walker had allegedly been drinking before the outburst, and it is believed the combination of amobarbital and alcohol caused him to lose consciousness and stop breathing. Efforts to resuscitate Walker failed and he was pronounced dead shortly thereafter. He was aged 32. The loss  was widely lamented.

In her biography of Walker and Jones, Star-Crossed, author Beverly Linet quotes Walker's friend Jim Henaghan, who was not mentioned in official accounts of Walker's death, as saying that he was present at the time of the events leading to Walker's death. Henaghan, who was married to Gwen Verdon at the time, stated that he stopped by Walker's house in Los Angeles, where they played cards, and Walker was behaving normally. Walker's psychiatrist arrived and insisted that he receive an injection. When Walker refused, Henaghan held him down in order for the physician to administer it. Walker soon lost consciousness, and frantic efforts to revive him failed.

Walker was buried at Lindquist's Washington Heights Memorial Park in Ogden, Utah.

Filmography

See also

References
Notes

Bibliography
 Linet, Beverly (1985) Star Crossed: The Story of Robert Walker and Jennifer Jones, New York: G. P. Putnam's Sons.

External links

 
 
 

1918 births
1951 deaths
American Academy of Dramatic Arts alumni
American male film actors
American male radio actors
American people of English descent
American people of Scottish descent
Drug-related deaths in California
Male actors from Salt Lake City
Burials in Utah
Metro-Goldwyn-Mayer contract players
20th-century American male actors
Barbiturates-related deaths
American Latter Day Saints
California Republicans
Utah Republicans